Heron Bay is a census-designated place in Henry and Spalding counties in the U.S. state of Georgia. Its population was 4,679 as of the 2020 census.

Demographics

2020 census

As of the 2020 United States census, there were 4,679 people, 1,046 households, and 976 families residing in the CDP.

References

Populated places in Henry County, Georgia
Populated places in Spalding County, Georgia
Census-designated places in Georgia (U.S. state)